Ooredoo Oman (formerly Nawras) is an Omani telecommunications company owned by Ooredoo (formerly the Qtel Group). It is the Sultanate’s first privately owned telecommunications company, and serves two million customers as of August 2010. It sells voice and data services over, among others, 2.75G, 3G+, 4G, 5G and fibre. Since 2010, it has been listed at the Muscat Securities Market, and is the fourth largest telecom company by market capitalisation.

History
Founded in 2004, the company sells landline voice and internet. It also has prepaid and post-paid mobile phone plans, and mobile internet service. The home broadband and voice was handled by WiMAX (Worldwide Interoperability for Microwave Access) technology but is being switched to LTE. Ooredoo was first to deploy 3G+ and is the only operator to deploy WiMAX commercially in Oman. The company also sells WiFi products for cafés, restaurants, hotels and schools. Ooredoo has set up the largest public WiFi zone in Oman, OoredooWiFi in the Muscat Grand Mall. In 2015, they installed a fiber-optic network across Oman.

References

External links
 Official website

Oman
Telecommunications companies of Oman
Telecommunications companies established in 2004
2004 establishments in Oman
Companies based in Muscat, Oman